The 2011 Delaware Fightin' Blue Hens football team represented the University of Delaware as a member of the Colonial Athletic Association (CAA) during the 2011 NCAA Division I FCS football season. Led by tenth-year head coach K. C. Keeler, the Fightin' Blue Hens compiled an overall record of 7–4 with a mark of 5–3 in conference play, tying for fifth place in the CAA. Delaware was not invited to the NCAA Division I Football Championship playoffs. The team played home games at Delaware Stadium in Newark, Delaware.

Schedule

References

Delaware
Delaware Fightin' Blue Hens football seasons
Delaware Fightin' Blue Hens football